Streptomyces mimosae is a bacterium species from the genus of Streptomyces which has been isolated from the root of a Mimosa pudica plant in Thailand.

See also 
 List of Streptomyces species

References 

mimosae
Bacteria described in 2020